Rush Lake is a high altitude lake located in Hunza Valley, Gilgit-Baltistan, Pakistan near Rush Pari Peak. At , Rush is one of the highest alpine lakes in the world. It is the highest lake in Pakistan and 27th highest lake in the world.

Rush Lake and Rush Peak is reached via Hunza and Hopar Valley via the Hopar Glacier (Bualtar Glacier) and Miar Glacier, which rises from Miar and Phuparash peaks. The trek to Rush Lake provides views of Spantik, Malubiting, Miar Peak, Phuparash Peak and Ultar Sar.

See also
 Hopar Valley
 List of lakes in Pakistan

References

External links
 Trek to the highest altitude Rush Lake in Pakistan The Nation

Lakes of Gilgit-Baltistan
Nagar District